Simpsonichthys is a genus of killifish from the family Rivulidae the species of which are endemic to temporary freshwater habitats like ponds in the upper Paraná, upper Araguaia, upper Jequitinhonha and São Francisco basins on the central Brazilian Plateau.

Species

As delineated by Fishbase the following species are included within the genus Simpsonichthys:

 Simpsonichthys alternatus (W. J. E. M. Costa & G. C. Brasil, 1994) 
 Simpsonichthys boitonei A. L. de Carvalho, 1959 (Lyrefin pearlfish)
 Simpsonichthys bokermanni (Carvalho, da & Cruz, 1987)
 Simpsonichthys cholopteryx W. J. E. M. Costa, C. L. R. Moreira & F. C. T. Lima, 2003
 Simpsonichthys constanciae (G. S. Myers), 1942 (Featherfin pearlfish)
 Simpsonichthys delucai Costa, 2003
 Simpsonichthys espinhacensis Nielsen, Pessali & Dutra, 2017
 Simpsonichthys fasciatus Costa & Brasil, 2006
 Simpsonichthys gibberatus Costa & Brasil, 2006
 Simpsonichthys margaritatus Costa, 2012
 Simpsonichthys marginatus Costa & Brasil, 1996
 Simpsonichthys multiradiatus Costa & Brasil, 1994
 Simpsonichthys nielseni Costa, 2005
 Simpsonichthys nigromaculatus Costa, 2007
 Simpsonichthys ocellatus Costa, Nielsen & de Luca 2001
 Simpsonichthys parallelus Costa, 2000
 Simpsonichthys perpendicularis Costa, Nielsen, de & Luca, 2001
 Simpsonichthys punctulatus Costa & Brasil, 2007
 Simpsonichthys rosaceus Costa, Nielsen, de & Luca, 2001 
 Simpsonichthys rufus Costa, Nielsen, de & Luca, 2001
 Simpsonichthys santanae (Shibatta & Garavello, 1992)
 Simpsonichthys similis Costa & Hellner, 1999
 Simpsonichthys stellatus (Costa & Brasil, 1994)
 Simpsonichthys suzarti Costa, 2004
 Simpsonichthys trilineatus (Costa & Brasil, 1994)
 Simpsonichthys virgulatus (Costa & Brasil, 2006)
 Simpsonichthys zonatus (Costa & Brasil, 1990)

Simpsonichthys sensu lato was formerly one of the larger genera in the family, but four former subgenera were elevated to full genera in 2010: Hypsolebias, Ophthalmolebias, Spectrolebias and Xenurolebias. Some uncertainty remains, with one genetic study supporting them, while another genetic study indicates that Simpsonichthys (sensu stricto), Hypsolebias and Spectrolebias are not monophyletic.

With these as separate genera, there are currently 9 recognized species in Simpsonichthys:

 Simpsonichthys boitonei 
 Simpsonichthys cholopteryx
 Simpsonichthys espinhacensis
 Simpsonichthys margaritatus 
 Simpsonichthys nigromaculatus
 Simpsonichthys parallelus
 Simpsonichthys punctulatus
 Simpsonichthys santanae
 Simpsonichthys zonatus

The name of this genus is a compound of the name of a friend of Antenor Leitão de Carvalho's, Charles J. Simpson of San Francisco, and the Greek for fish, ichthys.

References

 
Rivulidae
Freshwater fish genera